The 1913 Georgia Bulldogs football team represented the Georgia Bulldogs of the University of Georgia during the 1913 Southern Intercollegiate Athletic Association football season. The Bulldogs completed the season with a 6–2 record.   This team played Virginia for the first time since the tragic game of 1897 in which a Richard Von Albade Gammon died. Georgia also played its first game in Georgia Tech's new stadium (Grant Field), coming away with a victory. The 108–0 victory over Alabama Presbyterian in the first game of the season represents the largest margin of victory in Georgia football history.

Senior captain Bob McWhorter became the first player to be selected as an All-American for the Bulldogs after the 1913 season.

Schedule

References

Georgia
Georgia Bulldogs football seasons
Georgia Bulldogs football